Adeje is a town and municipality in the southwestern part of the island of Tenerife, one of the Canary Islands, and part of the province of Santa Cruz de Tenerife, Spain. The town Adeje is located 4 km from the coast, 8 km north of the resort town Los Cristianos, 60 km southwest of the island capital Santa Cruz de Tenerife and about 17 km northwest of Tenerife South Airport.

Adeje is the western terminus of the TF-1 motorway, which connects it with the south and east coast of the island. The Barranco del Infierno gorge is located in the municipality.

Its economy is based on business, tourism and agriculture. Adeje is also home to the large water park Siam Park, which is considered the best water park in the world. Adeje is an important tourist center both on the island and nationally and internationally. This municipality has the highest concentration of 5 star hotels in Europe and also has what is considered the best luxury hotel in Spain according to World Travel Awards.

History
A hundred years before the Spanish conquest (1494), this place was the capital of the Menceyato of Adeje, one of the guanches (local kingdoms) in which the island was divided. It is now one of the most important tourist cities in the Canary Islands.

Communities

Many seaside communities of Adeje are major tourist hot spots. The main communities there are:
 Costa Adeje
 Playa Paraiso
 La Caleta
 Playa Fañabe
 Callao Salvaje.

Siam Mall
Located next to the water kingdom of Siam Park, Siam Mall is a shopping center with two floors, alongside an underground parking lot with 1,100 free spaces.

Beaches 
Adeje beaches include:
 Playa Fañabé
 Playa del Duque
 Playa de Torviscas
 Playa la Pinta
 Playa Ajabo
 Playa San Juan
 Playa del Bobo
 Playa del puerto de Colón
 Playa Blanca

References

External links

 
   Adeje town hall

Municipalities in Tenerife